Portuguese in France (Luso-French) refers to people from Portugal who immigrated to or reside in France or French citizens of Portuguese descent.

Portuguese immigration in France took place mainly during the 1960s and 1970s, to escape dictatorship and conscription, and to enable immigrants to find better living conditions. Portuguese migrants were sometimes referred as gens des baraques ("people from the barracks"). Most began working in construction.

History

 Portuguese-Jews in France : the great immigration (1497 - 1600s ca.)

See also : French Sephardi Jews

Even tough contacts between the two countries were established in the Antiquity and the first king of Portugal was of French descent, for many centuries migration routes remained rather unexplored.

in fact, it is only in the XVI century that one of the first relevant influxes of Portuguese people coming to France was recorded. This immigration was partly a result of the expulsion decree issued in 1496 by the Portuguese monarchy, which targeted Jews and Moors living in Portugal. This decree forced many Jews to either convert to Christianity (leading to the emergence of Cristão-novos and of Crypto-Judaism practices) or leave the country, leading to a diaspora of Portuguese Jews throughout Europe, including France.

Starting from 1550, they were recognized rights previously reserved to French citizens only, thus encouraging further immigration. It is believed that up to 10,000 Portuguese-Jews might have migrated to France from 1497; this phenomenon remained noticeable up until the 1600s, when the Netherlands became a favourite choice.

As of consequence, many Portuguese-Jews settled in the western provinces of France, most notably in Nouvelle-Aquitaine establishing communities in cities such as Biarritz, Bayonne, Bordeaux, La Rochelle and Nantes. In the latter alone, in 1590 100 people of Portuguese-Jewish descent naturalized.

Due to their origin, upon their arrival in France, they were often referred to as nouveaux chrétiens (new Christians) forming the Nation Portugaise (Portuguese nation). On the surface, they strictly adhered to all the practices of the Catholic religion, but at home many remained true to Judaism.

At the beginning of the 17th century, some relaxed their observation of the Christian religion, and in the middle of the century, they stopped completely, returning openly to Judaism. They are then referred to as Juifs portugais (Portuguese Jews).

When the Jews, who had settled as new Christians in Bayonne or Bordeaux, fleeing the Spanish or Portuguese Inquisition, openly returned to Judaism, they began to celebrate services according to their original rite, which will be called mistakenly as a Rite portugais or Portuguese rite, when it has its source in Spain and many texts or prayers are said in Spanish . Unlike the Jews of Spanish origin who took refuge in Turkey , Greece and the Sephardic part of Bulgaria , who adopted Ladino (a sacred language, a mixture of Hebrew and Spanish) for their prayers, the Jews of Bayonne and Bordeaux never used it. Haïm Vidal Séphiha, professor emeritus and first holder of the chair of Judeo-Spanish at the Sorbonne, explains this difference by the proximity of Spain and the many commercial relations that the community maintained with this country.

The Portuguese-Jewish community was very active in international trade, mainly with countries where other Jewish communities of Spanish or Portuguese origin were established.

Among others, trade is flourishing with the Caribbean, the Netherlands Antilles , Amsterdam and London.  In particular, the Bayonne Jews introduced chocolate to France and made Bayonne the capitale du chocolat (chocolate capital) which it has remained.

Amongst notable Portuguese-Jews or people of Portuguese-Jewish descent having lived or moved to France, it is noteworthy to remember personalities such as Abraham Espinoza, grandfather of the world-famous philosopher, Abraham Furtado, Henri Castro, Elias Legarde, Solomon de Medina and Marc Bédarride. In addition, the first Jew recorded to having set foot in Canada, Esther Brandeau as well as Jacob Rodrigues Pereira, one of the inventors of deaf-mutes sign language, both had Portuguese-Jewish roots.

Amongst other contributions Portuguese-Jews have made to France, one ought to mention the Pereire brothers (Émile Pereire and Isaac Pereire) were among the most influential entrepreneurs in the XIX century, Benjamin Olinde Rodrigues (famous for Rodrigues' rotation formula), Eugène Péreire (founder of Banque Transatlantique), Noémie de Rothschild (founder of Société Française des Hôtels de Montagne), Catulle Mèndes, Eugénie Foa,  Jacob Émile Édouard Péreira Brandon, Pierre Mendès France, Daniel Iffla and Jules Carvallo (amongst the founders of the Alliance Israélite Universelle).

 A small community (1800s)

In the XIX century people from Portugal started emigrating again towards France. At the beginning the community was small and in the 1876 Census, the first mentioning the Portuguese, there were 1,237 members of the community. The growth of the community was slow, in a way that after the 1896 Census, numbering just 1,280 people, their numbers were discontinued from official French statistics.

 Portuguese expeditionary forces in France during the WWI

In 1918, an avenue was named avenue des Portugais (Portuguese Avenue) in Paris' 16th arrondissement It was previously known as Avenue de Sofia (Sofia Avenue).

The name pays tribute to the expeditionary forces sent by Lisbon (which represented 80,000 men); the kingdom of Bulgaria then ally of Germany was thus "sanctioned": Sofia its capital thus seeing itself deprived of a Parisian route in its name. By order of October 29, 1971, a street in Sofia's honour (rue de Sofia or Sofia street)was restored to the 18th arrondissement.

With the Expeditionary forces, some 22,000 Portuguese citizens came to France, amongst 600,000 foreign workers contracted for providing assistance to the nation's military efforts.

 A community growing against all odds (1916 - 1957)

Numbering about 22,000 after the WWI, the Portuguese became a relevant immigrant community in France. As the country was struggling with reconstruction efforts after the conflict, the French authorities aimed to maintain the presence of Portuguese individuals in France. Despite France's requests in 1918 and 1919 to reach an agreement with the Portuguese government, no resolution was achieved.

However, as France successfully established agreements with other nations such as Poland, Belgium, Italy, and Czechoslovakia, the inability to reach an agreement with Portugal had limited effects. Additionally, the absence of an agreement did not hinder Portuguese workers from immigrating to France through illegal means. Consequently, the Portuguese community reemerged in the 1931 census with a population of 49,000, predominantly male, and primarily employed in the industrial sector.

The 1930s economic crisis had severe consequences for Portuguese migrants, with French governments implementing laws and measures to prevent the arrival of new immigrants and to exclude foreign workers deemed undesirable. Many Portuguese were deported once they became jobless. Philippe Rygiel's research on Cher reveals that Portuguese were the most heavily impacted by expulsions and non-renewal of worker's identity cards.

As newcomers with limited French language proficiency, insufficient social capital, and with their state of origin refusing to sign any agreement with France, the Portuguese were the primary targets of a strict administration, claiming to defend national workers. Throughout the 1930s, the Portuguese population decreased considerably due to naturalizations, voluntary returns, expulsions, and deaths. By 1936, only 28,290 Portuguese remained in France.

In 1945, France hosted only a small number of Portuguese residents. Despite the French government's request to enforce the 1940 labor agreement, the Lisbon authorities declined, citing the need to retain their labor force. Agricultural landowners with substantial influence opposed the emigration of their people. Additionally, the Portuguese dictatorship was concerned about the return of its workers with liberal or even communist ideas, according to the French ambassador to Portugal. Hence, the Portuguese authorities refused to cooperate with the National Immigration Office and even banned emigration to France in 1955.

During the late 1940s and early 1950s, illegal departures to France were scarce, with only a few hundred per year. Typically, those who left for France had relatives who had already migrated before the war or who had voluntarily or involuntarily left France and returned. For instance, António P. was detained in 1953 at the Franco-Spanish border while entering France illegally. Born near Longwy in 1928, his parents had returned to Portugal in 1939–1940, and one of his brothers had served in Indochina.

 Great Portuguese emigration (1957 - 1974)

From the 1960s, the economic stagnation of Brazil, a traditional destination, and the measures taken by France to attract Portuguese workers gave an exceptional scale to Portuguese immigration to France.

In the mid-1950s, Portuguese moved to France in significant numbers to escape António de Oliveira Salazar's dictatorship. Between 1957 and 1974 some 900,000 Portuguese citizens sought refuge in France, mostly workers from the peasantry and young people refusing to be enrolled in the army for the colonial wars. Deserters were also very well received in Algeria and in the Scandinavian countries.

Leaders of the opposition to the dictatorship of António de Oliveira Salazar, notably communists, also found refuge in France to escape arrest. Most of the leaders of the Portuguese Communist Party were, however, banned from entering and staying in France, forcing them into hiding.

During this period the Portuguese rapidly became the largest foreign community in France. The numbers skyrocketed and the community already numbered 700,000 members in 1970. Fleeing misery, most of the Portuguese emigrants found unfavourable conditions upon arriving in France. For instance, it were the Portuguese, mostly, who developed and inhabited what is supposed to be the largest bidonville (or slum) ever emerged in France : up to 20,000 people lived in miserable conditions in Champigny-sur-Marne, on the outskirts of Paris. Many of the immigrants in fact settled in slums in the Paris region, in unhealthy conditions of extreme poverty. Most of these people were illiterate, peasants and villagers who employed themselves as unskilled laborers, cleaners or garbage collectors.

The majority of the emigrants settled in the Parisian banlieue, but, as time went by, many also resettled to other regions such as Corse or Normandy.

The phenomenon reached its peak in 1970, when in a single year 135,667 Portuguese left their homes for France. The French media tended to portray these emigrants as individuals with limited cultural knowledge and no political affiliation, typically associated with low-skilled jobs. Women are frequently depicted as gatekeepers, and men are often depicted as construction workers, perpetuating a stereotypical image that does not accurately reflect the diversity of their professions and skills.

From 1973, with the with the economic crisis ending the Trente Glorieuses (or thirty glorious years), the end of the dictatorship, the instauration of democracy and the end of the Colonial war, emigration to France fell sharply in the following decades.

 Stable emigration (1975 - 2000)

Following the improvement of economic conditions in Portugal, there was a decrease in the number of Portuguese emigrants leaving their home country in search of better opportunities in France. This could be attributed to a decrease in economic hardship and an increase in job opportunities in Portugal, reducing the push factors driving emigration. Additionally, improved economic conditions may have resulted in more favorable living conditions, further reducing the incentive for Portuguese citizens to leave their homeland. It's in this period that Portuguese people started growing roots in France, acquiring French citizenship, integrating into society, reaching positions before unimaginable and starting to speak French.

Between 1980 and 1999 73,384 Portuguese emigrated to France, a country that nevertheless remained the favourite destination for emigration, even tough Switzerland, Germany and the UK started attracting many Portuguese immigrants during this period as well.

 A new "boom" (2000-2012)

With the introduction of the euro and the easing of movement throughout the EU, Portuguese national's interest towards France was renewed. From 2003 to 2012 approximately 120,000 Portuguese settled in France. The numbers soared after the 2008 recession that has greatly influenced Portugal (where the unemployment rate skyrocketed to 17.1%) in a way that some started referring to a "new boom" in emigration. Still, as UK started gaining more attention in Portugal (where English had become the first foreign language, overtaking a position previously held by French) and as the economic conditions in Portugal become more favourable, the numbers soon dropped.

The community is now highly integrated : between 2000 and 2012 over 102,000 Portuguese acquired French citizenship, thus accounting for approximately 5.7% of the citizenship granted during this period.

 An integrated community (2013–present)

As the majority of the Portuguese in France are now French citizens and the community has achieved greater stability, their image in the country is more positive. The Luso-French, nevertheless, didn't forget their country of origin and between 2018 and 2022 the community sent approximately 5.4 billion€ to Portugal in remittances, thus confirming the prime role France has always had in sending remittances to Portugal, helping the country's growth and sustaining the family members living there.

Still, the migratory movement from Portugal to France remains quite strong, as between 2013 and 2020 a little over 87,500 Portuguese emigrated to France and, with little over 22,000 acquisitions of French citizenship, the Portuguese remain amongst the communities with the highest integration rate. Despite there being over 1,000,000 French people of Portuguese descent, thus not counting as Portuguese citizens in French statistics, the Portuguese remain one of the major immigrant communities in France nowadays. Relations between the two countries remain strong.

Demographics

In 2015, Michèle Tribalat, in an estimate of populations of foreign origin in  2011, estimated at least 1.5 million the number of people of Portuguese origin over three generations in 2011 according to the following distribution:

Note: for the 2nd generation  born in France, only people aged under 60 are taken into account.

Moreover, according to this same study by Michèle Tribalat, people of Portuguese origin over three generations represented 2.7% of the French population under 60 in 2011.

Destinations

 Île-de-France

In the 1960s, many Portuguese immigrants formed the shantytown of Champigny-sur-Marne which had more than 10,000 inhabitants.

Several other Portuguese slums have been formed, such as that of Massy for example or that of Francs-Moisins in Saint-Denis . The shantytowns disappeared between the end of the 1960s and the beginning of the 1970s and were replaced by HLM (Habitation à Loyer Modéré or Social Housing).

Since 1988, the church of Marie-Médiatrice-de-Toutes-les-Grâces has been entrusted to the Portuguese community of Paris under the name of "Notre-Dame-de-Fatima-Marie-Médiatrice".

In 2016 approximately 235,000 people living in the region were born in Portugal accounting for 2% of the population, concentrated especially in Val-de-Marne.

 Corse

In 2004, the Portuguese community in Corsica was one of the largest communities with more than 13,000  Portuguese.

Nouvelle Aquitanie

As in the past, when many Portuguese-Jews settled in western France, in the XX century the Portuguese community moving to the region became visible.

Cerizay, for instance, where more than 20% of the population is of Portuguese descent, is considered one of the "most Portuguese" communes in France. Similarly, in Labouheyre around 15% of the population id of Portuguese origin and in Lissac-sur-Couze a cemetery was dedicated to the Portuguese.

 Alpes-Maritimes

The Portuguese community in the Alpes-Maritimes département is well established. Already in 1989, the 5,000 people-strong Portuguese community was praised for being well integrated.

 Bretagne

The Portuguese came to Brittany since Antiquity, due to the commercial links between Phoenician Lisbon and the North Sea. In the 1950s, due to emigration, many settled in the region. For instance, 10% of the population of Groix Island (île de Groix) is of Portuguese descent.

Media

 Radio Alfa , Portuguese-speaking radio broadcasting in Île-de-France. Since June 1989, Radio Alfa has organized a popular event about Lusophone music, which is the Festa dos Santos Populares (French : fête Des   Saints Populaires ), being the largest gathering of the Portuguese community in Europe. It has more than 480,000 weekly listeners
 Radio Antenne Portugaise, Portuguese-speaking radio.
 RFI - português; Portuguese-language version of Radio France internationale.
 Frantugal.TV; small Franco-Portuguese channel, available for a monthly fee. They offer many documentaries on the reality of the Portuguese in France.

Literature

 Portugais et population d'origine portugaise en France by  Jorge Rodrigues Ruivo 
 La Valise en carton by Linda de Suza
 100 ans d'histoire des Portugais en France by Marie-Christine Volovitch-Tavares.
 Les Portugais à Paris, au fil des siècles et des arrondissements by  Agnès Pellerin, Xavier de Castro, Anne Lima
 Portugais et Luso-Français by Teresa Carreira and Maria Alice Tome
 La présence portugaise en France du XIIIème siècle à nos jours, by Manuel Do Nascimento

Cinema 

 Deux (Two, 2002), by Werner Schroeter
 A Religiosa Portuguesa (The Portuguese Nun, 2009) by Eugène Green
 A Gaiola Dourada (The Gilded Cage, 2013) by Ruben Alves
 Opération Portugal (Portugal Operation, 2021), by  Frank Cimière

Notable people

See also
Portuguese diaspora
France–Portugal relations

References

 

 
European diaspora in France
Immigration to France by country of origin
France